Peter Paul Odhiambo (born 9 September 1937) is a Ugandan boxer. He competed in the men's middleweight event at the 1964 Summer Olympics.

References

1937 births
Living people
Ugandan male boxers
Olympic boxers of Uganda
Boxers at the 1964 Summer Olympics
Place of birth missing (living people)
Middleweight boxers